is a Japanese director and animator. Maeda has served as animation director and technical director on various animated films and television series. He is currently a professor of animation at Kyoto Seika University.

Works

Anime
Zoo with no Elephant (1982) - Director
Noel's Fantastic Trip (1983) - Director
Run! White Wolf (1990) - Director
Tama and Friends (1993) - Director

TV series
Sunset on Third Street (1990–91) - Director

References

External links
 
 
 Tsuneo Maeda anime at Media Arts Database 

1946 births
Japanese film directors
Japanese television directors
Anime directors
Living people